Anastasiya Olegovna Krasovskaya  (born 1999) is a Belarusian and Russian model and actress. She is best known for her leading role in the film by Natalya Kudryashova Gerda (2021).

Biography
She was born on January 2, 1999, in Minsk. She also spent her childhood and youth there. She studied to be an international lawyer. Has no professional acting education. Since 2017 he has been working in the modeling business. She lived in China.

Selected filmography 

Music video
 Tima Belorusskih: Vitaminka (2019)

Awards 
 74th Locarno Film Festival: Best Actress

References

External links
 
 «Герда»: Как снять телесную драму о стриптизерше/студентке-соцфака и удивить Гаспара Ноэ
 Это мой город: актриса Анастасия Красовская

1992 births
Living people
Russian film actresses
Russian television actresses
Models from Minsk
21st-century Russian actresses
Belarusian female models
Russian female models
Belarusian film actresses
21st-century Belarusian actresses